Gedeón Guardiola Villaplana  (born 1 October 1984) is a Spanish handballer for TBV Lemgo and the Spain national team.

He is a twin brother of Isaías Guardiola, also a handballer.

References

External links

1984 births
Living people
People from Vinalopó Mitjà
Spanish male handball players
Liga ASOBAL players
SDC San Antonio players
Rhein-Neckar Löwen players
Handball-Bundesliga players
Handball players at the 2012 Summer Olympics
Expatriate handball players
Spanish expatriate sportspeople in Germany
Olympic handball players of Spain
Spanish twins
Twin sportspeople
Sportspeople from the Province of Alicante
Handball players at the 2020 Summer Olympics
Medalists at the 2020 Summer Olympics
Olympic bronze medalists for Spain
Olympic medalists in handball
21st-century Spanish people